Holliday may refer to:

Places in the United States
 Holliday, Missouri, a village
 Holliday, Pennsylvania, an unincorporated community
 Holliday, Texas, a city
 Holliday Creek (Missouri)
 Holliday Creek (Wichita River tributary), Texas

People 
 Holliday (name), a list of people with the surname or given name Holliday or Hollyday

See also 
 Halliday
 Holiday (disambiguation)